Wrestling competitions at the 2021 Junior Pan American Games in Cali, Colombia were scheduled to be held from December 1–4, 2021.

The winner of each weight category qualified for the 2023 Pan American Games.

Medal summary

Medal table

Medalists

Men's freestyle

Men's Greco-Roman

Women's freestyle

References

Wrestling
Pan American Games
Qualification tournaments for the 2023 Pan American Games